Painted Shut is the third studio album by American indie rock band Hop Along. It was co-produced, recorded and mixed by John Agnello in at Headroom Studios, in Philadelphia and Fluxivity Studios in Brooklyn, and released on May 4, 2015.

Background and recording
Vocalist Frances Quinlan stated that much of the album was tracked live.

Composition

Musical style 
Pitchfork likened the album's style to the "romantic, middle-American indie" of artists such as Bright Eyes and Rilo Kiley, while crediting punk rock for the band's "energy".

Lyrical content
The album's lyrical subject matter addresses topics such as poverty, abuse and mental illness.

The album's seventh track "Powerful Man" is based on an experience Quinlan had as a teenager, where they claim to have witnessed a young child being physically abused by their father. Quinlan admitted that the track was the first time they had felt uneasy about sharing lyrics, due to their personal nature.

Critical reception
Allmusic awarded the album four-and-a-half stars, directing praise towards Frances Quinlan's vocal performance.

Accolades

Track listing

Charts

References

2015 albums
Albums produced by John Agnello
Hop Along albums
Saddle Creek Records albums